This is a list of fellows of the Royal Society elected in 1903.

Fellows
Thomas William Bridge  (1848–1909)
John Edward Stead  (1851–1923)
Johnson Symington  (1851–1924)
Sir William Maddock Bayliss  (1860–1924)
Sir Horace Darwin  (1851–1928)
Sir Aubrey Strahan  (1852–1928)
William Philip Hiern  (1839–1929)
Henry Reginald Arnulph Mallock  (1851–1933)
Sir David Orme Masson  (1858–1937)
Arthur George Perkin  (1861–1937)
Ernest Rutherford Baron Rutherford of Nelson (1871–1937)
Ralph Allen Sampson  (1866–1939)
Alfred North Whitehead  (1861–1947)
Sydney Arthur Monckton Copeman  (1862–1947)
Sir John Sealy Edward Townsend  (1868–1957)

References

1903
1903 in the United Kingdom
1903 in science